Parthenius II Pankostas served as Greek Orthodox Patriarch of Alexandria between 1788 and 1805.

References

1735 births
1805 deaths
18th-century Greek Patriarchs of Alexandria
19th-century Greek Patriarchs of Alexandria
People from Patmos